Daryl Ernest O'Brien (born 10 September 1941) is a former Australian rules footballer who played 135 games for the North Melbourne in the Victorian Football League (VFL) during the 1960s.

A tenacious utility player who often started on the half-back flank, he was also considered one of the toughest and most effective "taggers" of the period and one of the hardest men to beat one-on-one in the league.  O'Brien's tagging role embodied a who's who of top players of that era, including Ron Barassi, Bobby Skilton, Peter Hudson, Alex Jesaulenko, Peter Crimmins, Darrel Baldock, Roger Dean, John Sharrock, Des Tuddenham, Ted Whitten and John Northey.

Recruited from West Coburg, O'Brien captained North Melbourne's under-19 side for two years before playing a handful of senior games as a half-forward flanker in the 1960 season. He was dropped to the reserves for the whole of 1961. In the lead-up to the 1962 season, O'Brien was invited to train by both Essendon and Footscray. O'Brien formally requested a clearance to Footscray, seeing that as an opportunity to again play at the senior level. This prompted a re-think by North Melbourne and he was retained, reinventing himself as a half-back flanker and utility player. He excelled in these roles, justifying North's decision to turn down the transfer. O'Brien became a stalwart in the Kangaroo side for the next eight seasons, and in 1964 was runner-up to Noel Teasdale in the Syd Barker Medal, North Melbourne's best and fairest award.

In 1968, O'Brien was selected to represent Australia as part of the Australian Football World Tour, the second of the international rules football series against Ireland.

In 1970, O'Brien joined Victorian Football Association (VFA) team Brunswick, and was appointed the dual role of captain-coach at the end of the 1971 season.  He led the side to a Second Division Grand Final appearance in 1973, after which he announced his playing days were over.

O'Brien went on to serve in the North Melbourne match committee as a team selector under premiership coach Ron Barassi.

While playing senior football, O'Brien studied to become a licensed realtor and auctioneer, eventually becoming a director and later partner of a real estate business in Melbourne, Victoria. He is now retired and lives in Gowanbrae, Victoria.

Notes

References

External links

Daryl O'Brien player bio (and scan of 1968 Scanlen's bubblegum "footy card")
Super8 film taken during the 1968 'Galahs' Football World Tour by Daryl O'Brien

1941 births
Australian rules footballers from Victoria (Australia)
North Melbourne Football Club players
Brunswick Football Club players
Brunswick Football Club coaches
Australian auctioneers
Living people